The Vilayet of Kastamonu was a first-level administrative division (vilayet) of the Ottoman Empire, established in 1867 and abolished in 1922. The accuracy of the population figures ranges from "approximate" to "merely conjectural" depending on the region from which they were gathered.

History

In the 1920s, the region was described by the British G.W. Prothero as being mountainous and having a primarily Muslim population.

Economy
The vilayet was not known for large agricultural production, despite being described as having fertile ground in 1920. Most agricultural production is kept within the vilayet, being consumed by the population. What was produced, included wheat, barley, maize, chickpeas, gall, and valonia oak. A small amount of opium and cotton was also produced in the region. Silk production was active in the southern area on a small scale, as was livestock. The area used to mine lead and nickel.

Cloth was also being produced in the Kastamonu Vilayet, made from wool and goat hair, which was mainly sold to locals. Sinop produced cotton cloth as well, with detailed embroidery. In the western part of the vilayet, rugs were produced. Sinop and Ineboli both were centers for boatbuilding.

Administrative divisions

Sanjaks of the Vilayet:
 Sanjak of Kastamonu (Kastamonu, İnebolu, Safranbolu, Taşköprü, Daday, Cide, Tosya, Araç)
 Sanjak of Kengiri (Çankırı, Çerkeş)
 Sanjak of Sinob (Sinop, Boyabat, Ayancık)

 Sanjak of Bolu (Sanjak of Boli), now Bolu Province, was an independent sanjak within the borders of Kastamonu Vilayet. Localities within the sanjak: Bolu, Karadeniz Ereğli, Bartın, Gerede, Göynük, Akçakoca, Düzce, Devrek, Mudurnu.

References

External links
 
 

 
Vilayets of the Ottoman Empire in Anatolia
History of Bartın Province
History of Bolu Province
History of Çankırı Province
History of Düzce Province
History of Karabük Province
History of Kastamonu Province
History of Sinop Province
History of Zonguldak Province
1867 establishments in the Ottoman Empire
1922 disestablishments in the Ottoman Empire